General elections were held in Guyana on 17 July 1973. The result was a victory for the People's National Congress, which won 37 of the 53 seats. However, the PNC's victory was the result of fraud as the government had direct control of the elections. Voter turnout was 81.0%.

Electoral system
The National Assembly had 53 members, elected by proportional representation in a nationwide constituency.

This was the last election in Guyana where the entire National Assembly was elected by direct popular vote until 2001, as a new constitution adopted in 1980 provided for an expanded Assembly of 65 members: 53 elected under the old system, ten appointed by the regional councils created by the 1980 constitution (to be elected at the same date as the National Assembly), and two by the National Congress of Local Democratic Organs (an umbrella body representing these regional councils, also created by the 1980 constitution).

Results

References

Guyana
1973 in Guyana
Elections in Guyana